The China Coast Guard operates a variety of vessels for its duties. In addition, the China Coast Guard also operates a handful of Harbin Z-9 helicopters, and a maritime patrol aircraft based on the Harbin Y-12 transport.

Vessels
As of 2020, the list of various classes of CCG vessels includes:

References

External links 
 CCG – Chinese Defence Today
  China Maritime Safety Administration official website
  China State Oceanic Administration
  Aid to navigation
  China Hydrography
  China Rescue & Salvage

See also 

 Republic of China Coast Guard
 People's Armed Police
 People's Liberation Army Navy
 People's Liberation Army Navy Coastal Defense Force
 China Maritime Safety Administration takes on the navigation safety and control duties, including harbormaster powers in most ports. It was not merged with the new coast guard in 2013.
 China Marine Surveillance Defunct in July 2013. The present China Coast Guard is a unified force that conducts law-enforcement operations in waters administered by China.

 
China Coast Guard
Military equipment of the People's Republic of China